The M-84AS1 and M-84AS2 are substantially modernized versions of the M-84 main battle tank designed by the Military Technical Institute and produced by Technical Overhauling Institute "Čačak" in Serbia. The first version designated as M-84AS1 was presented in 2017. Later revisions feature numerous improvements and were presented in 2020 and 2021.

Latest revisions of the AS1 and AS2 incorporate newly domestically developed modular explosive reactive armour, a modern battlefield management and fire-control system, a remote controlled weapon station and other updates. A total of 21 subsystems are updated with modern solutions. AS1 and AS2 are developed in parallel and differ in the number of implemented subsystems and some specific turret modification regarding RCWS, the commander hatch and equipment implementation. AS2 is probably going to be used as a platoon commander tank as soon as mass modernization begins.

Design and development

History 
The imperative for modernization of Serbia's aging M-84 fleet presented the Military Technical Institute Belgrade and Serbian Defense Industry with numerous tasks and challenges.

Serbia inherited some 212 M-84 from Yugoslavia of which most never experienced any kind of modernization since their adoption. Though a modernization program for the M-84 called M-84AB1 (later renamed to M-84AS) has been presented in 2004 by Serbia featuring several russian weapon systems, it has never seen mass adoption and only 10 M-84 were upgraded to this standard, probably due to the financial and political situation of Serbia at that time.

Since then tank designs around the world saw a number of fundamental improvements like the incorporation of explosive reactive armour, updated subsystems and optics or even active protection systems. It became evident that even the M-84AS modernization was obsolete and a completely new modernization program was needed to bring the M-84 to a level where it could keep up in terms of effectiveness and protection.

M-84AS1 (2017) 
The first version of M-84AS1 from 2017 had several changes and improvements compared to the M-84A and basic M-84 including original model of T-72.

Domestic first-generation explosive reactive armour was applied(comparable to Kontakt-5), covering a bigger area of the front turret and a sizeable portion of the front plate, providing better protection. A new fire-control system with domestic laser and radar warning systems was implemented along with a 12.7mm remotely controlled weapon station and a soft active protection suite. The back of the hull and turret is further fitted with cage armour while armour plates attached to the frontal hull remained.

Although these changes were an improvement over the previous M-84, this design still had major flaws, especially when it comes to protection. It was criticized for the low reactive armor coverage, bad sensor placements and low situational awareness. The weaknesses of this initial version were recognized and further development of the modernization package commenced. The result was a revised M-84AS1 which was presented in 2020.

M-84AS1 (2020) 
The M-84AS1 from 2020 corrected many of the flaws that were found on the previous version from 2017. The turret and hull are almost completely covered with domestic second-generation explosive reactive armour M19, providing increased protection from modern threats like top-attack or tandem-charge missles according to the designers. A total of nine new subsystems are integrated. Among them an improved fire-control system with an integrated day/night sight and new sensors.

New forms of passive and Active protection system are developed. Protection against Top attack missiles like FGM-148 Javelin is increased by using better composition of modular Explosive reactive armour that protects top of turret and soft kill Active protection system that is using Smoke grenade with Infrared smokes to create Smoke screen in order to block missile guidance. Day/night, thermal cameras and commander scope with 6 low light cameras with other sensors increase Situation awareness of tank crew. Early warning sensors for detection of radar, laser designation and launching of rockets are coupled with automatic delivery of Smoke grenade towards threat to achieve protection. Second generation (comparable to third generation in other countries) of domestic Explosive reactive armour ERO-19 better than Kontakt-5 and comparable with Relikt is developed to protect against newer tandem charge HEAT warheads. Additional slat armor for protection against rocket-propelled grenades is also present. Automatic fire extinguisher capable to react in milliseconds with modern UV sensors for fire detection is added to stop explosions in tank compartments. New type of RCWS with 12.7mm machine-gun is added so commander can operate safely inside turret. In total about 21 news subsystems are developed to increase survivability, mobility and precision of M-84AS1 and M-84AS2. CBRN defense is increased with new sensors and automation process. New tank gun 125mm with modern thermal sleeve will be produced in Borbeni složeni sistemi factory and new ammunition with better penetration and explosive characteristics including 125mm Airburst round.The APFSDS shell that is being issued to the tank is known to have 500mm of penetration at 2 kilometers range.

Production
Numerous companies will participate in production of many tank subsystems while Tehnički remontni zavod Čačak will be finalist for modernized tank under a guidance by Military Technical Institute Belgrade.

Producers involved in production of M-84AS1 tank and subsystems are:
Technical Overhauling Institute "Čačak" - reactive and other armor,  overhaul and modernization center and finalist for new tanks
ATB Sever - automatic loading system 
Sloboda - ammunition and smoke discharge units
PPT Namenska - hydraulics, transmission parts and turret movement system
Teleoptik žiroskopi - optics, gyroscopes and gyroscopic devices and Fire-control system with software, electronics and electronic elements of active protection system
Zastava kovačnica (part of Zastava Arms) - tank tracks
14. oktobar - finalist, modular tank engine manufacturer, engine and transmission parts, shell parts for ammunition  
Yugoimport SDPR - 125mm gun and barrels, welded turrets, rcws, radio-logical-chemical subsystem, fire suppression subsystems
EI Opek  - detection of cumulative charge breach for automatic fire extinguisher, tank ammunition fuses 
Imtel komunikacije, Belgrade - UORZ -Radar warning and direction finding system - part of protection system
Zastava Arms - machine-guns 12.7mm and coaxial 7.62mm

Effectiveness

Many improvements that are adopted for M-84AS1 and M-84AS2 Serbian domestic modernization, gave better final results than some other current modernization programs developed for T-72. While basic armour of some T-72 versions is better than basic armour of M-84, additional newer and better placed modular Explosive Reactive Armour will provide better cover and protection and new systems will provide much better additional situation awareness with better gun and ammunition. The new tank variant will feature an improved engine over a regular T-72 (increased from 780 to 840 horsepower), that will give an overall edge in combat to M-84AS1 compared most other modernized T-72 variants. In terms of protection, it is often considered even better than its Russian T-72B3 counterpart.

See also

M-84
M-84AS
M-84D

References

External links

 Article on the M84-AB1, published in "Odbrana" 
 Article on M-84 published by UK parliament commons
 Forecast international on tank engine
 Canadian assessment of ordnance

Post–Cold War main battle tanks
Main battle tanks of Serbia
Tanks with autoloaders
Military Technical Institute Belgrade